The following is a list of books by Australian author Jackie French that have received awards, honours and been shortlisted, among other things, for literary prizes.

Rain Stones
first published 1991

 Shortlisted - NSW Premier's Literary Awards: Children's Book Award (1991)
 Shortlisted - CBCA Children's Book of the Year Award: Younger Readers(1992)
 Shortlisted - West Australian Young Readers' Book Award: Primary Age Group (1993)

Walking the Boundaries
first published 1993

 Won - Notable Book, CBCA Children's Book of the Year Award: Younger Readers (1994)
 Shortlisted - Australian Multicultural Children's Literature Awards: Junior Section

Somewhere Around the Corner
first published 1994

 Honour - CBCA Children's Book of the Year Award: Younger Readers (1995)
 Highly Commended - Annual Australian Family Therapists' Award for Children's Literature (1994)

Daughter of the Regiment
first published 1998

 Shortlisted - CBCA Children's Book of the Year Award: Younger Readers (1999)

Hitler's Daughter
first published 1999

 Won - CBCA Children's Book of the Year Award: Younger Readers (2000)
 Won - Sanderson Young Adult Audio Book of the Year Awards: Vision Australia Library (2000)
 Won - UK National Literacy Association WOW! Award
 Won - Semi-Grand Prix Award (Japan)
 Won - Notable Book, US Library Association Notable Book
 Won - Kids Own Australian Literature Award: Roll of Honour (2007)
 Won - Kids Own Australian Literature Award: Roll of Honour (2008)
 Shortlisted - Books I Love Best Yearly: Older Readers (2001)
 Shortlisted - West Australian Young Readers' Book Award (2002)
 Shortlisted - Kids Own Australian Literature Award (2002)
 Shortlisted - Canberra's Own Outstanding List (2002)
 Shortlisted - Young Australian Best Book Award (2002)
 Shortlisted - Children's Choice Book Awards: Older Readers
 Shortlisted - Young Australian Best Book Award: Fiction for Older Readers (2007)
 Shortlisted - Young Australian Best Book Award: Fiction for Older Readers (2008)
 Shortlisted - Kids Own Australian Literature Award: Favourite Book of 2008 (2008)
 Named a "Blue Ribbon" book by the Bulletin for the Center of Children's Books in the USA (2003)
 Admitted to the Kids' Own Australian Literature Awards' Hall of Fame

The Café on Callisto
first published 2000

 Won - Aurealis Award for Best Children's Short Fiction (2001)

Lady Dance
first published 2000

 Won - Notable Book, CBCA Children's Book of the Year Award: Younger Readers (2001)

Stamp, Stomp, Whomp
first published 2000

 Won - Notable Book, CBCA Children's Book of the Year Award: Younger Readers (2001)

Missing You, Love Sara
first published 2000

 Won - Notable Book, CBCA Children's Book of the Year Award: Older Readers (2001)
 Shortlisted - West Australian Young Readers' Book Award: Older Readers (2001)
 Shortlisted - Kids Own Australian Literature Award (2002)
 Shortlisted - Young Australian Best Book Award (2002)

How to Guzzle Your Garden
first published 2000

 Shortlisted - CBCA Children's Book of the Year Award: Eve Pownall Award for Information Books (2000)

In the Blood
first published 2001

 Won - ACT Book of the Year (2002)

Ride the Wild Wind
first published 2002

 Won - Notable Book, CBCA Children's Book of the Year Award: Younger Readers (2003)
 Shortlisted - New South Wales Premier's Literary Awards - Patricia Wrightson Prize for Children's Literature (2003)

Diary of a Wombat
first published 2002

 Won - American Library Association Notable Children's Book
 Won - Canberra's Own Outstanding List Award for Best Picture Book (2003)
 Won - Young Australian Readers' Award (2003)
 Won - Kids Own Australian Literature Award: Best Picture Book (2003)
 Won - ABA/A A Neilson Book of the Year (2003)
 Won - Benjamin Franklin Award, USA (2004)
 Won - Lemmee Award, USA (2004)
 Won - KIND Award, USA (2004)
 Won - Kids' Reading Oz Choice Award (2007)
 Won - Books I Love Best Yearly Award (2008)
 Honour - CBCA Children's Book of the Year Award: Picture Book (2003)
 Shortlisted - Young Australian Best Book Award (2003)
 Shortlisted - Australian Publisher's Association Book Design Awards for Best Designed Children's Picture Book (2003)
 Shortlisted - Galley Club Award, Picture Book category of the Children's Choice Book Awards (2003)
 Shortlisted - Books I Love Best Yearly Award (2004)
 Shortlisted - Book Sense Book of the Year Award: Children's Illustrated Book (2004)
 Shortlisted - Books I Love Best Yearly Award (2007)
 Voted Favourite Picture Book of the Year in the Cuffie Awards in the USA
 Tied with Diary of a Worm for Funniest Book in the Cuffie Awards in the USA (2003)
 Number two on the 'Best 20 picture books for 2003' in the USA (2003)

Flesh and Blood
first published 2003

 Shortlisted - Aurealis Award for best young-adult novel (2004)

Valley of Gold
first published 2003

 Won - Notable Book, CBCA Children's Book of the Year Award: Younger Readers (2004)

Too Many Pears!
first published 2003

 Shortlisted - COOL Award (2004)
 Shortlisted - Kids Own Australian Literature Award  (2004)

To the Moon and Back
first published 2004

 Won - CBCA Children's Book of the Year Award: Eve Pownall Award for Information Books (2005)

My Dad the Dragon
first published 2004

 Won - Notable Book, CBCA Children's Book of the Year Award: Younger Readers (2005)

Tom Appleby, Convict Boy
first published 2004

 Won - Notable Book, CBCA Children's Book of the Year Award: Younger Readers (2005)

Pete the Sheep
first published 2005

 Won - Kids Own Australian Literature Award (2005)

The Secret World of Wombats
first published 2005

 Shortlisted - NSW Premier's Literary Awards: Patricia Wrightson Prize for Children's Literature (2006)

They Came on Viking Ships
first published 2005

 Won - West Australian Young Readers' Book Award: Younger Readers (2007)
 Shortlisted - Essex Book Award (UK)
 Shortlisted - NSW Premier's History Awards: The Young People's History Prize (2006)

Josephine Wants to Dance
first published 2006

 Won - Australian Booksellers' Book of the Year: Younger Readers (2007)
 Won - Notable Book, CBCA Children's Book of the Year Award: Early Childhood (2007)
 Won - Notable Book, CBCA Children's Book of the Year Award: Picture Book (2007)

The Goat who Sailed the World
first published 2006

 Won - Notable Book, CBCA Children's Book of the Year Award: Younger Readers (2007)
 Shortlisted - Young Australian Best Book Award (2008)

Macbeth and Son
first published 2006

 Won - Notable Book, CBCA Children's Book of the Year Award: Younger Readers (2007)
 Shortlisted - CBCA Children's Book of the Year Award: Younger Readers (2007)

The Shaggy Gully Times
first published 2007

 Won - White Raven Award (2008)
 Shortlisted - CBCA Children's Book of the Year Award: Younger Readers (2008)

Pharaoh
first published 2007

 Shortlisted - CBCA Children's Book of the Year Award: Older Readers (2008)
 Shortlisted - ACT Book of the Year (2008)

A Rose for the Anzac Boys
first published 2008

 Honour Book - CBCA Children's Book of the Year Award: Older Readers (2009)

The Night They Stormed Eureka
first published 2009

 Won - NSW History Award: Young People's History Prize (2011)

The Donkey who Carried the Wounded
first published 2009

 Won - Notable Book, CBCA Children's Book of the Year Award: Younger Readers (2010)

Weevils, War & Wallabies: 1920-1945
first published 2009

 Won - Notable Book, CBCA Children's Book of the Year Award: Eve Pownall Award for Information Books (2010)

Queen Victoria's Underpants
first published 2010

 Won - Notable Book, CBCA Children's Book of the Year Award: Picture Book (2011)

Oracle
first published 2010

 Won - Notable Book, CBCA Children's Book of the Year Award: Younger Readers (2011)

A Waltz for Matilda
first published 2010

 Won - Notable Book, CBCA Children's Book of the Year Award (2011)

Christmas Wombat
first published 2011

 Shortlisted - Australian Book Industry Award: Book of the Year for Younger Children

Nanberry: Black Brother White
first published 2011

 Won - Notable Book, CBCA Children's Book of the Year Award: Younger Readers (2012)
 Honour - CBCA Children's Book of the Year Award: Younger Readers (2012)
 Shortlisted - Australian Book Industry Awards (2012, awaiting judging)

Flood
first published 2011

 Won - International White Raven Award (2012)
 Won - Notable Book, CBCA Children's Book of the Year Award: Picture Book (2012)
 Honour - CBCA Children's Book of the Year Award: Picture Book (2012)

The Roo that Won the Melbourne Cup
first published 2012

 Won - Notable Book, CBCA Children's Book of the Year Award: Younger Readers (2013)

Pirate Boy of Sydney Town 
first published 2019
 Shortlisted - Young People's History Prize, New South Wales Premier's History Awards (2020)

References

Lists of awards received by writer